Bacha may refer to:

 Bacha Khan, Pashtun revolutionary leader
 Selma Bacha, French women's footballer
 Sher Ali Bacha, Pashtun nationalist politician
 Pacha Khan Zadran, Afghan militia and political leader

 Ahmed Bin Saleh Bel Bacha (born 1969), one of the Algerian detainees at Guantanamo Bay
 Sir Bhinod Bacha, former most senior Civil Servant of Mauritius and political figure
 Colocasia gigantea, also known as "bac ha", a Southeast Asian vegetable
 Bacha bazi (sometimes known as "bacchá"), an Afghan tradition of keeping boys as concubines as women and girls are forbidden to perform for men

See also 
Baadshah (disambiguation)